Bhatt Bhika was a  Brahmin bard in the court of Guru Arjan, whose two hymns are present in Guru Granth Sahib, the holy book of Sikhs.

References

Sikh Bhagats